Rill Baxter (born October 26, 1962) is a former professional tennis player from the United States.  

Baxter enjoyed most of his tennis success while playing doubles. During his career he finished runner-up at 2 doubles events.  He achieved a career-high doubles ranking of World No. 69 in 1987.  Baxter was on the Pepperdine University men's tennis team from 1980-1984.

Career finals

Doubles (2 runner-ups)

External links
 
 

American male tennis players
Sportspeople from Sarasota, Florida
Pepperdine Waves men's tennis players
Tennis people from Florida
1962 births
Living people